The following radio stations broadcast on AM frequency 600 kHz: 600 AM is a Regional broadcast frequency

Argentina 
 LU5 in Neuquén, Neuquén.

Bolivia 
 CP190 in Sucre

Brazil 
 ZYH920 in São Luís, Maranhão
 ZYH287 in São Gabriel da Cachoeira, Amazonas
 ZYH486 in Barreiras, Bahia
 ZYI789 in Arcoverde, Pernambuco
 ZYH538 in Rio Real, Bahia
 ZYH617 in Aracati, Ceará

Canada

Chile 
 CD-060 in Osorno.
 CB-060 in Santiago.

Colombia 
 HJHJ in Barranquilla
 HJZ95 in Barbacoas
 HJZ72 in Ricaurte, Nariño

Cuba 
 CMAA in Bahía Honda
 CMKA in San German

Ecuador 
 HCXY2 in Guayaquil

El Salvador 
 YSNK in San Salvador

Guatemala  
 TGRC in Tiquisate

Honduras 
 HRLP 13 in Choluteca

Mexico 
 XEBB-AM in Acapulco, Guerrero
 XEHW-AM in Chametla, Sinaloa
 XEMN-AM in San Nicholas de Los Garza, Nuevo León
 XEOCH-AM in Ocosingo, Chiapas

Nicaragua 
 YNVH in Managua

Peru 
 OAX6S in Toquepala

Suriname 
 PZX20 in Paramaribo

United States

Venezuela 
 YVQB

External links

 FCC list of radio stations on 600 kHz

References

Lists of radio stations by frequency